Li Zhaoshen (born 13 October 1956) is a Chinese military physician who is director of Digestive System Department, Changhai Hospital Affiliated to Naval Medical University, and an academician of the Chinese Academy of Engineering.

Biography 
Li was born in Ningjin County, Hebei, on 13 October 1956. In 1980, he graduated from Naval Medical University and earned a master's degree in 1988.

He became director of National Clinical Research Center for Digestive Disease in October 2014 and director of Shanghai Institute of Pancreatic Diseases in January 2015.

On 1 July 2019, news media exposed his academic misconduct such as suspected plagiarism of academic papers.

Honours and awards 
 2010 State Science and Technology Progress Award (Second Class)
 2013 State Science and Technology Progress Award (Second Class)
 2018 State Science and Technology Progress Award (Second Class)
 27 November 2017 Member of the Chinese Academy of Engineering (CAE)

References 

1956 births
Living people
People from Ningjin County, Hebei
Engineers from Shanxi
Chinese physicians
Members of the Chinese Academy of Engineering